Navicula conveyi is an algae in the genus Navicula, known from inland waters of the Antarctic and Sub-Antarctic regions.

References

Further reading
Sterken, Mieke, et al. "An illustrated and annotated checklist of freshwater diatoms (Bacillariophyta) from Livingston, Signy and Beak Island (Maritime Antarctic Region)." Plant Ecology and Evolution 148.3 (2015): 431-455.

External links

AlgaeBase

conveyi
Protists described in 2011